The Environment Bureau (ENB) is a defunct executive agency of the Government of Hong Kong in operation from 2007 to 2022. It was responsible for developing policies in environmental protection, energy, climate change, sustainable development, nature conservation; enforcing environmental legislation. This also includes monitoring environmental quality, energy efficiency, waste management, renewable energy development, regulatory oversight of the electricity sector in Hong Kong The bureau was managed by the Secretary for the Environment.

As part of the government bureaux restructuring on 1 July 2022, the bureau was replaced by the enlarged Environment and Ecology Bureau, which took over all policy portfolios under the former Environment Bureau.

Subordinate departments
The following public entities are managed by the bureau:

Environmental Protection Department
Energy and Sustainable Development Branch

See also 
Hong Kong Disciplined Services

References

External links
http://www.enb.gov.hk/

Hong Kong government policy bureaux
2007 establishments in Hong Kong
Government agencies established in 2007